Lovtidende is the official gazette of Denmark in which new legislation is announced. First published in the 1870s, it became available on the worldwide web on 1 January 2008. The Danish Lovtidende (Law Tidings) and Statstidende (State Tidingsh are respectively the law gazettes of the legislative and executive bodies.

References

External links

Law of Denmark
Government of Denmark
Government gazettes
Transcripts of legislative proceedings